Dennistoun is a mostly residential district in Glasgow, Scotland, located north of the River Clyde and in the city's east end, about  east of the city centre. Since 2017 it has formed the core of a Dennistoun ward under Glasgow City Council, having previously been a component of the East Centre ward.

Aside from the smaller Haghill neighbourhood further east, Dennistoun's built environment does not adjoin any others directly, with the M8 motorway dividing it from Royston to the north, while the buildings of Glasgow Royal Infirmary and Wellpark Brewery plus the Glasgow Necropolis cemetery lie to the west, and railway lines form the southern boundary with the Calton/Gallowgate neighbourhoods, and Camlachie (a historic district which is now largely a retail park) on the opposite side.

History
Dennistoun was established by Alexander Dennistoun, Scottish merchant, bank director and, for a short time, an MP. Over a period, Alexander Dennistoun purchased a number of small estates neighbouring his Golf Hill property, including Craig Park, Whitehill, Meadow Park, Broom Park, Annfield, Bellfield, and Wester Craigs. The area was surveyed and laid out in streets, terraces, and drives, overseen by Glasgow architect James Salmon; it was incorporated into the city officially in 1846. The first plots in Dennistoun were leased from 1861; and after Glasgow Corporation acquired the Kennyhill estate and laid it out as Alexandra Park with Alexandra Parade as its western approach, the Dennistoun suburb grew rapidly.

Unable to attract the middle-class residents intended by its original developers, it established itself as a respectable working class area for families. After the Second World War, the area's Victorian tenements were refurbished and extended rather than replaced with high-rise modernist blocks as in other working-class districts such as neighbouring Calton and Parkhead, and this, coupled with proximity to the city centre and Caledonian and Strathclyde universities, has contributed to its gentrification in recent years; many of its residents are now students and young professionals.

Amenities

Retail facilities
The community is well served by two shopping areas on Duke Street and Alexandra Parade. There are also two supermarkets and two long-established Italian delicatessens. Although the fortunes of local businesses have varied over the years, more recently a clear upturn in the number of independent retail and leisure premises has been apparent.

Parks
Dennistoun benefits from a large Victorian-era park, Alexandra Park, which is bounded predominantly by the M8 motorway, Cumbernauld Road and Provan Road.  The Park takes its name from Princess Alexandra of Denmark, the wife of the future King Edward VII of the United Kingdom, who performed the official opening in 1870. The park was established in 1866 when the City Improvement Trustees purchased Alexandra Park from Mr Walter Stewart of Haghill under special powers conferred upon them by legislation. Mr Alexander Dennistoun, the proprietor of the adjoining estate of Golfhill, gave  of land to the City Improvement Trustees, situated near the south-west corner adjacent to Alexandra Parade, which now forms the principal pedestrian entrance.

The park is home to a  cast-iron Walter MacFarlane-built  which was given to the city after the 1901 International Exhibition and remained in Kelvingrove Park for 12 years after the exhibition. In 1914, Glasgow Corporation took the decision to re-site this magnificent piece of industrial architecture to its present location. The fountain was restored to its former glory in 2000.

Arts
Dennistoun has one of Glasgow's original Carnegie libraries, deftly designed in the Edwardian Baroque style by James Robert Rhind.

Market Gallery, an artist-run contemporary art gallery, is located on Duke Street and spread over three shop units. WASPS artists' studios, a charity providing affordable studio space to support up to 750 artists, is located on Hanson Street.

Housing

Although predominantly consisting of three- and four-storey tenements, the Victorian villas and terraces to the west (towards the city centre) illustrate part of Alexander Dennistoun's original plan for the whole area. Dennistoun is made up of a number of smaller neighbourhoods including Milnbank to the north, 'The Drives' in the centre of the area and Bellgrove south of Duke Street - since 2007, the latter has fallen under a different multi-member council ward (Calton) from the rest of the district, and this situation remained even when the Dennistoun ward was created a decade later, with its boundaries instead including the Royston and Germiston neighbourhoods on the other side of the M8.

Education
There are three main primary schools in the greater Dennistoun area (excluding Haghill): Golfhill Primary, originally located on Circus Drive but now housed within the main building of Whitehill Secondary School (the original school building still stands, however remains derelict due to health and safety reasons. The school was built upon the site of a filled quarry and this has led to significant structural problems), Alexandra Parade Primary School located on Armadale Street and St Denis' RC Primary School on Meadowpark Street.

The only secondary school in the area is Whitehill Secondary School which is majority fed by pupils from Golfhill Primary, Alexandra Parade Primary and Haghill Primary. As it is a non-denominational school, most of the pupils from St Denis' go to St Mungo's Academy located on Crownpoint Road, Gallowgate.

Aquatic sports
Whitehill Pool was opened in 1978 and is shared with the neighbouring school  It provides a 25m pool, small teaching pool, fitness suite, health suite and spectator gallery with over 200 seats and is situated on Onslow Drive.

Religion
The area has a proliferation of churches, including the Church of Scotland, Roman Catholic (including Our Lady of Good Counsel, designed by noted Modern architects Gillespie, Kidd & Coia), Baptist, Salvation Army, independent Evangelical churches, Plymouth Brethren, Charismatic, one Scottish Episcopal Church and a Christadelphian presence.

In 2007 it was decided that the two Church of Scotland congregations, Dennistoun Blackfriars and Dennistoun Central churches, would unite to form Dennistoun New Parish Church. This followed long vacancies dating from 2000 (Dennistoun Blackfriars) and 2004 (Dennistoun Central).

Transport
The district is served by Alexandra Parade, Duke Street and Bellgrove railway stations (all on the North Clyde Line) as well as numerous bus routes, offering commuter services to the city centre and on toward the western suburbs.

Demographics
In a 2004 census the area had a population of roughly 10,530.

Notable people
James Livingstone Begg, geologist
 Alex Rae, footballer
Hugh Brown, Labour Party M.P. who earned the 'Red Clydesider' title
George Burt, cricketer
Jon Campbell, producer (The Time Frequency)
Stuart Cosgrove, broadcaster
Rikki Fulton, entertainer
Jack House, journalist and author
Ford Kiernan, comedian
Lulu, singer grew up in a top floor flat of 29 Garfield Street
Charles Rennie Mackintosh, architect, designer and artist
Jimmy Mason, footballer
William Miller, poet (author of Wee Willie Winkie)
Dorothy Paul, entertainer
Willie Sharp, footballer
Flora Mc Donald (Mary Muir) Music Hall entertainer in the 1920s

References

External links

 Dennistoun Online - Local community forum and news pages
 Dennistoun Community Council - group responsible for ascertaining, coordinating and expressing the views of the wider community
 Dennistoun Conservation Society - Local conservation society
Dennistoun profile at Understanding Glasgow
Milnpark Housing Association
Reidvale Housing Association 

Areas of Glasgow